Heiterwang is a municipality in the district of Reutte in the Austrian state of Tyrol.

Geography
Heiterwang lies south of Reutte on the Heiterwanger See, which is connected by canal to the Plansee.

References

External links

Cities and towns in Reutte District